Lil Kiiwi is the debut studio album by American singer-songwriter Kiiara. It was released on October 9, 2020, through Atlantic Records, and Warner Music Group. The album came four years after her debut EP Low Kii Savage, as well as a string of several singles.

Release and singles
The album was announced a week prior to its release, with the revealing of the artwork and track listing. "Gold" was released as Kiiara's first single through Atlantic Records on October 26, 2015. The song was a sleeper hit, peaking at number 13 on the Billboard Hot 100 approximately a year after its release. The single has been certified multi-platinum in several countries including the United States, Australia, and Canada. "Feels" was released on January 15, 2016 as the second single from the EP Low Kii Savage. Although the single failed to enter any major music charts, it has been certified Gold by the Recording Industry Association of America. Another one, "Whippin", was released on April 12, 2017. The song features Kiiara's long-time collaborator Felix Snow as the guest artist. It was a moderate success, charting in Canada, Netherlands, Belgium, and Czech Republic. "I Still Do" was released on July 17, 2020 as the lead single from the album. The song was written by Justin Tranter, Ali Tamposi, and Jason Evigan alongside Kiiara, and was accompanied by a music video. The single "Never Let You" was released on August 21, 2020 and lyrically talks about her wanting to quit music. A collaboration with DeathbyRomy and Pvris named "Numb" was released on September 8, 2020. A collaboration with Blackbear named "So Sick" was released as the following single, also counting with a music video. A remix of the track by Danish DJ Martin Jensen" was also unveiled.

"Open My Mouth" was originally released as the lead single from Kiiara's debut album; however, the song was included on the deluxe edition of Lil Kiiwi, along with "Messy", as well as "Tennessee" and "Intention" from Low Kii Savage.

Track listing

Certifications

References

2020 debut albums
Electropop albums
Kiiara albums